Alfred Francis Russell (25 August 1817 – 4 April 1884) was an Americo-Liberian missionary, planter, and politician who served as tenth president of Liberia from 1883 to 1884 after serving as vice-president under Anthony William Gardiner, whom he succeeded as president.

Born in Lexington, Kentucky, Russell was emancipated in 1833 (with his mother Amelie "Milly" Crawford) by their mistress Mary Owen Todd Russell Wickliffe (Russell's grandmother through his white father). Wickliffe also emancipated his cousin, Lucretia Russell, and her four children. Both families emigrated together from the United States to Liberia that year. Alfred F. Russell later married and had a daughter by the name of Julia Ann, who later married John Douglas Simpson one of the first black congressmen from Florida, United States. They both had several children including Alpha Douglas Simpson, father of former Vice President of Liberia Clarence L. Simpson Sr. Alfred Russell served as a Methodist missionary and later owned a large coffee and sugarcane farm. Russell continued to serve as a Methodist minister after entering politics; he was also elected to the Liberian Senate, and served as President Pro Tempore of the Senate of Liberia.

Early life
Russell was born into slavery in 1817 Lexington, Kentucky, as the mixed-race, very white son of Amelie "Milly" Crawford, a mixed-race woman described as octoroon (meaning she was  European in ancestry). Their mistress was Jane Hawkins Todd Irvine. These two slaves were the subject of gossip in Lexington, first bruited by Robert S. Todd. Robert J. Breckinridge published a pamphlet revealing the Lexington gossip: that Alfred Francis Russell's father was John Russell, Irvine's grandson and Mary Owen Todd Russell Wickliffe's son from her previous marriage. During a summer visit with his grandmother, John Russell, then a student at Princeton University, raped the enslaved octoroon Milly Crawford. Their son Alfred was overwhelmingly European in ancestry and appearance; he was only  African. In many states at the time he would have been considered legally white although born into slavery.

After Irvine's death in 1822, Alfred Russell and his mother were sold to Irvine's daughter Mary Owen Todd Russell Wickliffe and her husband Robert. (Mary Wickliffe was the mother of John Russell by her late husband James Russell.) Alfred and his mother called their new mistress Mrs. Polly; she was a wealthy heiress of the frontiersman Colonel John Todd. He was the brother of Levi Todd, the grandfather of Mary Todd Lincoln.

In 1833, Mary Wickliffe emancipated Alfred (her grandson by blood) and his mother Milly; she also freed his cousin Lucretia (Lucy) Russell and her four children: Sinthia, Gilbert, George, and Henry, all of whom were of majority-white ancestry. They emigrated that year with nearly 200 other colonists to Liberia on the brig Ajax under auspices of the American Colonization Society; Alfred was fifteen years old when they arrived with other pioneers in Liberia on 11 July 1833. Some 146 pioneers survived the voyage; about 30 children had died during the voyage.

Pioneers in Liberia
The Russells were among the last of 1,400 settlers to the colony. Conditions were very harsh for the pioneers; they suffered greatly from local diseases, including malaria, and supplies were extremely short in the colony for some time. "Housing was inadequate, food was scarce, and medical service was almost nonexistent." His cousin Lucy, her daughter Sinthia and two eldest sons all quickly succumbed to the local fever, which caused ulcers. Sinthia died in 1836 and Gilbert in 1839. Alfred Russell also suffered this disease, which resulted by 1835 in his having to use a crutch.

Russell's mother Milly married George Crawford, another immigrant. She died in 1845 of "dropsey", and he died the following year. Russell wrote in 1855 of their struggles in Africa:  "It was so long before we could find Africa out, how to live in it, and what to do to live, that it all most cost us death seeking life."

Lucy Russell married a man by the surname of Briant. By 1857, she had learned to read and write, as she wrote to her former master Robert Wickliffe from Liberia, asking to be remembered to his daughters and other persons she knew.

Political career
Russell was trained to be a teacher after having suffered an illness that caused an injury in one leg. He later became an Episcopal priest in the St. Paul River area, where he had 200 acres in the Clay Ashland district, purchased for the free people of color by the Kentucky Colonization Society, an affiliate of the ACS. He cultivated sugar cane and coffee, for which he hired indigenous workers.

Russell also became active in politics. In 1881, he ran for vice-president with Anthony W. Gardiner, who won the presidency for a third term. When health issues resulted in Gardiner's resignation three years later, Russell became president.

Presidency (1883–1884)

Territorial conflict with the British
The conflict with the British, which had reached a crisis during the Gardiner administration, was still unsolved. Two months after Russell took office, in March 1883, the British Government annexed the Gallinas territory west of the Mano River and formally incorporated it into their colony of Sierra Leone, like Liberia established as a place of resettlement of free blacks and liberated slaves.

Whenever the British and French seemed intent on enlarging at Liberia's expense the neighboring territories they already controlled, periodic appearances by U.S. warships helped discourage encroachment. But successive American administrations rejected appeals from Monrovia for more forceful support. Russell, along with Gardiner, has been notably blamed for Liberia's losing much of its territory to the British. This was likely why he was not re-elected to the presidency for a second term.

Economy
In the decades after 1868, escalating economic difficulties weakened the state's dominance over the coastal indigenous population. As conditions worsened, the cost of imports was far greater than the income generated by exports of coffee, rice, palm oil, sugar cane, and timber. Liberia tried desperately to modernize its largely agricultural economy.

Death and legacy
Russell died, three months after he left office, on 4 April 1884.

Russell is survived by many descendants in Liberia and West Africa, and he was the paternal great-grandfather of Clarence Lorenzo Simpson. He also has collateral paternal Russell relatives in U.S. states such as Maryland, Kentucky, and South Carolina.

See also
History of Liberia

References

Further reading
Smither, James Wesley. Sojourners in Search of Freedom: The Settlement of Liberia by Black Americans. Lanham, Maryland: University Press of America, Inc., 1987.
Liebenow, J. Gus. Liberia: the Quest for Democracy. Bloomington: Indiana University Press, 1987.
See further: History of Liberia, further reading

External links
"Alfred Francis Russell," A Durable Memento: Portraits by Augustus Washington, African American Daguerreotypist, exhibit, National Portrait Gallery, Smithsonian Institution
See History of Liberia, external links

Americo-Liberian people
1817 births
1884 deaths
Politicians from Lexington, Kentucky
Presidents of Liberia
Vice presidents of Liberia
Presidents pro tempore of the Senate of Liberia
True Whig Party politicians
19th-century Liberian politicians
19th-century African-American people